Giorgio de' Buondelmonti (1411–53) was briefly the ruler of Ioannina in 1411.

Giorgio was the son of Esau de' Buondelmonti by his third wife, Jevdokija Balšić.  When his father died on February 6, 1411, his mother attempted to maintain control of Ioannina in the name of her infant son. Jevdokija was not popular with the local nobility.  When they learned that she was seeking to marry a Serbian nobleman, they promptly deposed her and her son just 20 days after his accession, on February 26, 1411, and surrendered their city to Carlo I Tocco. Giorgio survived until at least 1453, and his name appears in various Ragusan documents.

References
 
 
 
 George C. Soulis, The Serbs and Byzantium, Athens, 1995.

Year of death unknown
15th-century deaths
15th-century despots of Epirus
Year of birth unknown
Medieval child monarchs
Monarchs deposed as children
15th-century Italian nobility
Medieval Ioannina
Giorgio